Fizz usually refers to effervescence.

"Fizz" may also refer to:

 Fizz (cider), a brand of cider
 Fizz (cocktail), a mixed drink
Fizz, nickname of cricketer Mustafizur Rahman
 Fizz (novel), a 2011 novel by Zvi Schreiber
 The Fizz, a British pop music group
 The FIZZ, a 2006–2007 TV program
 Fizz, a character in the video game League of Legends
 Fizz, a character in the children's TV show Tweenies
 Fizz, a Canadian mobile virtual network operator on Videotron

See also 
 
 
 Fiz (disambiguation)
 Bucks Fizz (disambiguation)
 Ffizz, a British television sitcom
 Fiz Brown, a character in TV soap opera Coronation Street